Elmar Bolowich (born July 10, 1954) was most recently head coach of the George Mason Patriots men's soccer team at George Mason University in Fairfax, Virginia, United States. He was previously the head coach of the Creighton Bluejays men's soccer team at Creighton University in Omaha, Nebraska for eight years after leaving his 22-year tenure as the head coach of the North Carolina Tar Heels men's soccer team at the University of North Carolina.

Career

Creighton Bluejays

Bolowich joined Creighton University on February 9, 2011. He is assisted by Johnny Torres and Michael Gabb, both former players of Creighton University.

Since 2011, Bolowich has led the Bluejays to an overall 95–29–12 record (last updated, Feb. 2017). In 2015, the Creighton Bluejays men's soccer team had 19 wins during the season, the most wins in Division I, as well as the a scoring average of 2.3 goals per game (the third-best scoring offense in the nation). The same season, Bolowich recruited Fabian Herbers, a runner-up for the MAC Hermann Trophy, and Big East Conference Offensive Player of the Year. Fabian Herbers and Timo Pitter represented Creighton Bluejays men's soccer and were both named to the NCSAA All-America First Team. Vincent Keller was selected for the NCSAA All-America Third Team and the Big East Conference First Team. Success for Bolowich and the Creighton Bluejays men's soccer saw additional rewards, as then freshman, Joel Rydstrand, made the Big East Conference All-Freshman team; Timo Pitter won the Big East Conference Midfielder of the Year; and Connor Sparrow earned BIG EAST Co-Goalkeeper of the Year. Fabian Herbers and Timo Pitter were drafted into the MLS, although Timo Pitter retired in January 2017.

In 2014, Bolowich and the Creighton Bluejays men's soccer lead the nation with the best winning percentage 16–3–3 (.795) as well as the regular season champions of the Big East Conference (7–1–1). Bolowich shared the title of BIG EAST Coach of the Year, and Fabian Herbers Timo Pitter won BIG EAST Offensive and Midfield Players of the Year, respectively. In 2012, Bolowich led Creighton to 17–4–3 record and their second consecutive NCAA Division I College Cup although both times the team fell just short of the National Title. In his inaugural season at Creighton, Bolowich won three coaching awards: NCSAA Midwest Coach of the Year; Missouri Valley Conference Coaching Staff of the Year; and the MLSSoccer.com Coach of the Year.

The Creighton Bluejays men's soccer team play at Morrison Stadium, unique in that Creighton University is the only university with a stadium exclusive to soccer.

North Carolina Tar Heels

Since 1988, Bolowich compiled a 280–144–40 (0.647) record in 22 seasons making him the winningest coach of the North Carolina Tar Heels men's soccer program. Under Bolowich's direction, the North Carolina Tar Heels men's soccer won the 2001 NCAA Division 1 Championship by defeating the Indiana University Hoosiers 2–0 with a 21–4–0 record on the season. This marked the first national title for the North Carolina Tar Heels men's soccer program. Coach Bolowich led the program to the NCAA tournament in nine out of his last 10 seasons, and reached the Elite Eight five of his last 10 seasons. In 2001, he won the NSCAA National Coach of the Year award. During his last 11 seasons at North Carolina, Bolowich led the team to 6 appearances in the NCAA quarterfinals. He led the North Carolina Tar Heels men's soccer team to the NCAA tournament 15 times as well as three NCAA College Cup appearances in the three years before he transferred to Creighton University.

Under Coach Bolowich, the Tar Heels also won the 2000 Atlantic Coast Conference championship and the regular season titles in 2000, 2009, and 2010. Bolowich won the NSCAA National Coach of the Year Award in 2001 as well as the ACC Coach of the Year in 2000 and 2010.

At the University of North Carolina, he succeeded the then women's and men's soccer coach Anson Dorrance to take the head coaching position in 1988 after serving as a part-time assistant coach for the men's Tar Heel soccer team in 1986. From 1987–8, he was a full-time assistant coach to Dorrance. It was in 1987 when the Tar Heels won their first ACC tournament championship and advanced to their first Final Four 1987 NCAA Division I Men's Soccer Championship where North Carolina lost to Clemson University in the semi-final round 4–1.The also won their 1st ACC tournamen beating N.C. State in the final 3–2 The game was played at Riggs Field at Clemson University, despite the North Carolina Tar Heels men's soccer team having defeated Clemson Tigers men's soccer team twice earlier on in the 1987 season.

Professional players coached

Bolowich coached 45 players onto the professional pitch since the beginning of Major League Soccer in 1996, some of whom went to play abroad, as well as on the United States men's national soccer team, the FIFA World Cup, and the Olympics. Four of Bolowich's former players have gone on to coach in the MLS.

Players who appeared on the United States men's national soccer team roster
 Eddie Pope – FIFA World Cup player in 1996, 2002, and 2006; 1996 Olympics; USMNT 1996–2006; D.C. United, MetroStars, Real Salt Lake
 Gregg Berhalter – FIFA World Cup player in 2002 and 2006: USMNT 1994–2006; Crystal Palace, 1860 Munich, Los Angeles Galaxy; head coach of Columbus Crew SC
 Kerry Zavagnin – USMNT 2000–2006; Kansas City Wizards; assistant coach for Sporting Kansas City
 Logan Pause – USMNT 2009; Chicago Fire; former interim assistant coach for Chicago Fire; head coach for Orange County SC
 Dax McCarty – USMNT 2009–; FC Dallas, D.C. United, New York Red Bulls, Chicago Fire
 Ethan Finlay – USMNT 2016–; Columbus Crew SC

Current and former professional players
 Timo Pitter
 Fabian Herbers
 Tyler Polak
 Eric Miller
 Greg Jordan
 Stephen McCarthy
 Rob Lovejoy
 Jalil Anibaba
 Michael Farfan
 Kirk Urso
 Zach Lloyd
 Eddie Ababio
 Corey Ashe
 Michael Harrington
 Jordan Graye
 Michael Ueltschey
 Justin Hughes
 Marcus Storey
 Tim Merritt
 Caleb Norkus
 Chris Leitch
 Eddie Robinson
 Matt Crawford
 Chris Carrieri
 Temoc Suarez
 Nicholas Efthimiou
 Chad Ashton
 David Testo

References

External links
http://tarheelblue.cstv.com/sports/m-soccer/mtt/bolowich_elmar01.html
https://web.archive.org/web/20110426215305/http://www.gocreighton.com/ViewArticle.dbml?SPSID=89398&SPID=2518&DB_OEM_ID=1000&ATCLID=205093063&Q_SEASON=2010
http://www.gocreighton.com/coaches.aspx?rc=691&path=msoc
http://www.mlssoccer.com/post/2010/10/06/qa-unc-tar-heels-coach-elmar-bolowich
https://www.wsj.com/articles/SB10001424052970204262304577068500242533514
http://www.nytimes.com/2011/12/09/sports/soccer/bolowich-puts-creighton-in-college-cup-semifinals.html

1954 births
Living people
North Carolina Tar Heels men's soccer coaches
Creighton Bluejays men's soccer coaches
Johannes Gutenberg University Mainz alumni
German football managers
American soccer coaches
George Mason Patriots men's soccer coaches